Juan García Esquivel (January 20, 1918 – January 3, 2002), often known mononymously as Esquivel!, was a Mexican band leader, pianist, and composer for television and films. He is recognized today as one of the foremost exponents of a sophisticated style of largely instrumental music that combines elements of lounge music and jazz with Latin flavors.  Esquivel is sometimes called "The King of Space Age Pop" and "The Busby Berkeley of Cocktail Music", and is considered one of the foremost exponents of a style of late 1950s-early 1960s quirky instrumental pop that became known (in retrospect) as "Space Age Bachelor Pad Music".

Early life
He was born in 1918, in Tampico, Tamaulipas, and his family moved to Mexico City in 1928 where he became a self-taught musician from an early age. In interviews, Esquivel's family members have stated that the young boy started playing piano when he was around 6 years old, to the amazement of older musicians who would gather around him in disbelief and to his own delight exhibiting his musical gifts. They have also stated  that Esquivel continued to eschew formal musical training as he grew older, preferring to learn from books and by listening to and playing music instead.

Music
Esquivel played a style of late 1950s-early 1960s quirky instrumental pop known today as lounge music.  Esquivel's musical style was highly idiosyncratic, and although elements sound like his contemporaries, many stylistic traits distinguished his music and made it instantly recognizable. These  included exotic percussion, wordless vocals, virtuoso piano runs, and exaggerated dynamic shifts.  He used many jazz-like elements; however, other than his piano solos, there is no improvisation, and the works are meticulously arranged by Esquivel himself, who considered himself a perfectionist as a composer, performer, and recording artist.

His orchestration employed novel instrumental combinations, such as Chinese bells, mariachi bands, whistling, and numerous percussion instruments, blended with orchestra, mixed chorus, and his own heavily ornamented piano style. Vocal groups were often utilized to sing only nonsense syllables, most famously "zu-zu" and "pow!"  A survey of Esquivel's recordings reveals a fondness for glissando, sometimes on a half-valved trumpet, sometimes on a kettle drum, but most frequently on pitched percussion instruments and steel guitars.

Esquivel's use of stereo recording was notable, and he occasionally employed two bands recording simultaneously in separate studios, such as on his album Latin-Esque (1962). That album's song "Mucha Muchacha" makes unusual use of stereo separation, with the chorus and brass rapidly alternating in the left and right audio channels.

He arranged many traditional Mexican songs like "Bésame Mucho", "La Bamba", "El Manisero" (Cuban/Mexican) and "La Bikina"; covered Brazilian songs like "Aquarela do Brasil" (also known simply as "Brazil") by Ary Barroso, "Surfboard" and "Agua de Beber" by Tom Jobim, and composed spicy lounge-like novelties such as "Mini Skirt", "Yeyo", "Latin-Esque", "Mucha Muchacha" and "Whatchamacallit".  He was commissioned to compose the music of a Mexican children's TV show Odisea Burbujas.

His concerts featured elaborate light shows years before such effects became popular in live music.  He performed in Las Vegas on several occasions, often as the opening act for Frank Sinatra. He frequently performed at the Stardust casino lounge circa 1964.

Several compilations of Esquivel's music were issued on compact disc starting with Space Age Bachelor Pad Music in 1994. The first reissues were compiled by Irwin Chusid (who also produced the first CD compilation of Raymond Scott recordings and the premiere release of The Langley Schools Music Project). The success of these releases led to reissues of several of Esquivel's original 1950s-'60s albums.  

The last recording on which Esquivel worked was Merry Xmas from the Space-Age Bachelor Pad in 1996, for which he did a voiceover on a track by the band Combustible Edison.  This album also included several obscure tracks from his past sessions.  The last CD released during his lifetime, See It In Sound, was actually recorded in 1960, but was not released at the time because the record company believed it would not be commercially successful.  When released in 1998, it exhibited very unusual and introspective stylings absent from his other works, including a version of "Brazil", played as a musical soundscape of a man bar-hopping where the band plays different renditions of "Brazil" at each bar.

Esquivel also worked as composer for Revue Productions/Universal Television. There he scored the TV western series "The Tall Man," and co-wrote, with Stanley Wilson, the Revue/Universal TV logo fanfare.

Music in recent TV and films
Esquivel's recording of "Boulevard of Broken Dreams" was used in episode two of Better Call Saul.

His recording of his composition "Mucha Muchacha" was used in the films Confessions of a Dangerous Mind, The Big Lebowski, The Notorious Bettie Page, Stuart Saves His Family, Nacho Libre and Beavis and Butt-Head Do America.

His recording of his composition "Whatchamacallit" was used in the 2002 film Secretary.

"Mini Skirt" was used as the opening theme for the BBC documentary series Louis Theroux's Weird Weekends and When Louis Met....

Esquivel’s recording of "My Blue Heaven" was used in the trailer for the 2021 film Malibu Road.

In 2022, Esquivel's 1959 recording of "Fantasy" was used by Apple in its "Data Auction" global TV ad campaign, to promote privacy on its iPhone product.

Influences
Kronos Quartet recorded a string quartet arrangement of Esquivel's song "Mini Skirt" for their album Nuevo.

Discography
(12" LP releases, US and Mexico)
 Las Tandas de Juan Garcia Esquivel (1957, RCA Victor Mexico)
 To Love Again (1957, RCA Victor)
 Cabaret Tragico (April 1958, RCA Victor Mexico)
 Other Worlds Other Sounds (October 1958, RCA Victor)
 Four Corners of the World (December 1958, RCA Victor)
 Exploring New Sounds in Hi-Fi/Stereo (May 1959, RCA Victor)
 The Ames Brothers: Hello Amigos (1959, RCA Victor)
 Strings Aflame (August 1959, RCA Victor)
 The Merriest of Christmas Pops (1959, RCA Victor)
 Infinity in Sound, Vol. 1 (August 1960, RCA Victor)
 Infinity in Sound, Vol. 2 (April 1961, RCA Victor)
 Latin-Esque (1962, RCA Victor)
 More of Other Worlds Other Sounds (1962, Reprise Records)
 The Living Strings: In a Mellow Mood (1962, RCA Camden)
 The Genius of Esquivel (1967, RCA Victor)
 1968 Esquivel!! (1968, RCA Mexico)
 Burbujas  (1979)
 Odisea Burbujas (1980, Discos America)
 Vamos al Circo (1981, Discos America)
(CD releases)
 Space-Age Bachelor Pad Music (1994, Bar/None Records)
 Music From a Sparkling Planet (1995, Bar/None Records)
 Cabaret Mañana (1996, BMG Entertainment)
 Merry Xmas from the Space-Age Bachelor Pad (1996, Bar/None Records)
 See It in Sound (1998, House of Hits Records), recorded 1960, previously unreleased
 The Sights and Sounds of Esquivel  (2005, Bar/None Records)
 Esquivel! Remixed (2006, SonyBMG Mexico)
 Complete 1954–1962 Recordings (2017, New Continent, Europe)
(Related releases featuring Esquivel's music)
 The Unforgettable Sounds of Esquivel (Mr. Ho's Orchestrotica, 2010)
 Perfect Vision: The Esquivel Sound – Metropole Orkest (June 2013, Basta Music)

See also
 Exotica
 Space age pop

References

Further reading
Wood, Susan (2016). Esquivel! Space-Age Sound Artist. .

External links
 Bar-none.com
 SpaceAgePop.com on Esquivel
 Weirdomusic.com on Esquivel
 
 Space Age Bachelor Pad Music on the Web on Esquivel

1918 births
2002 deaths
Exotica
Bandleaders
Mexican composers
Mexican male composers
Mexican pianists
20th-century pianists
Mexican jazz musicians
Male pianists
20th-century male musicians
Male jazz musicians
People from Tampico, Tamaulipas